Shelton Hank Williams (born December 12, 1972), known as Hank Williams III, is an American musician, singer and multi-instrumentalist, known for his unique fusion of traditional country music, rockabilly, heavy metal and punk rock. He was the drummer of hardcore punk band Arson Anthem, and former bassist of Phil Anselmo's band Superjoint Ritual. He has released eleven studio albums, including five for Curb Records. Williams is the grandson of Hank Williams, the son of Hank Williams Jr., the nephew of Jett Williams, the half-brother of Holly Williams, and the father of Coleman Williams.

Music career

Early career
Williams spent much of his early career playing drums in punk rock bands during the late 1980s and early-to-mid-1990s. During this time frame, Williams was informed that he had fathered a son, Coleman Finchum, who was five years old by that time; a family court judge ordered Williams to find more stable employment so that Finchum could receive child support.

Williams later played bass guitar in  the heavy metal band Superjoint Ritual, now renamed as Superjoint for legal reasons, led by former Pantera vocalist Phil Anselmo. Williams also played drums for Arson Anthem, formed with Anselmo and Mike Williams of the sludge metal band Eyehategod.

Recordings for Curb Records (1996-2010) 
Capitalizing on his family name and resemblance to his grandfather, he signed a contract with Nashville music industry giant Curb Records. Three Hanks: Men with Broken Hearts was issued shortly thereafter, which spliced together recordings to make it seem that three generations of Williams men were singing alongside one another. In the late 1980s, upon first meeting Hank Williams III, Minnie Pearl, a friend of the late Hank Williams Sr., reportedly said "Lord, honey, you're a ghost", as she was astonished by his striking resemblance to his grandfather.

Hank Jr. and Hank III, due to the success of the Three Hanks album, would receive a Vocal Duo of the Year nomination by the Academy of Country Music in 1997.

Williams' first solo album, Risin' Outlaw, was released in September 1999 to respectable sales and strong reviews, despite Williams's own hatred of the record.

In 2003, Williams recorded This Ain't Country for Curb, who chose not to release it. On May 17, 2011, Curb released the album under the title Hillbilly Joker, without the consent or input from Williams after his contract with the label had been terminated.

In 2006, after resolving a contractual dispute with Curb Records, Williams released Straight to Hell on Curb's rock imprint, Bruc. Battles with Walmart delayed the appearance of this album, which was released on February 28, 2006, as a two-disc set in two formats: a censored version (for Wal-Mart), and an uncensored version that was the first major-label country album ever to bear a parental advisory warning. Straight to Hell was also the first release through Curb's Bruc Records imprint. However, the uncensored version was released through Bruc, and the clean version was released through Curb. One of the songs, "Pills I Took", was written by a little-known Wisconsin group called Those Poor Bastards, who originally released the song on their 2004 CD Country Bullshit.

Williams released Assjack's self-titled debut album on August 4, 2009, through Curb.

His next album, Rebel Within, was released in May 2010, and was his last album with Curb Records. It charted at number 20 in Billboard magazine.

Between 2012 and 2017, Curb would release a series of unauthorized compilations of Williams' music. On April 17, 2012, Curb released a Williams album titled Long Gone Daddy, marking the second album the company has released under his name since his departure. In April 2014, Curb Records released a new album under Hank Williams III's name titled Ramblin' Man. The album contains previously unreleased material that Williams recorded while on their label. The following year, Curb released another Williams album of previously unreleased songs titled Take As Needed for Pain. The album is mostly a rock album but the single released was a country song titled "Ruby Get Back to the Hills". On August 18, 2017, Curb released a Greatest Hits album featuring select tracks from Williams' first four albums, mostly from Straight to Hell.

Independent releases (2011–2014)

On June 23, 2011, Williams' personal Facebook revealed that he would be releasing four new CDs on September 6, 2011. It said to expect country, doom-rock, and speed metal with cattle callin' on the releases. Entitled Ghost to a Ghost/Gutter Town (a 2-disc country record with some ambient and folk influences), 3 Bar Ranch Cattle Callin''' (a metal record in the newly anointed cattle core genre) and Attention Deficit Domination (a doom-rock record), these new albums were released on Williams's own record label Hank3 Records through Megaforce Records, and feature guest appearances by Tom Waits, Les Claypool (Primus), Alan King (Hellstomper), Ray Lawrence Jr., Troy Medlin (Sourvein), Dave Sherman (Earthride) and Williams' dog, Trooper.

On March 4, 2013, Williams's web site announced that he is working on two new albums. It has been confirmed that there are at least 25 new songs. On May 3, 2013, Williams released the names of two new albums: a country album Brothers of the 4×4 and punk album A Fiendish Threat, under the band name "3".

On January 1, 2013, Williams' new side project was announced, as well as the release of two new videos; one for Brothers of the 4x4, the other for A Fiendish Threat. The albums were released in the fall of 2013.

On July 6, 2018, Williams was featured on DevilDriver's cover of his song "Country Heroes", which appears on their album Outlaws 'til the End: Vol. 1. On May 24, 2021 he released a cover of the David Allan Coe song "You Never Even Called Me By My Name" on his YouTube channel.

In 2021, Williams' son, Coleman Finchum, changed his last name to Williams began recording and releasing music under the moniker "IV". He formed a band known as "IV and the Strange Band". Their debut album, Southern Circus, was released in June 2022.

On September 18, 2022, he released a number of new songs on his YouTube channel.

 Music style 

Williams' music is a mixture of traditional country music, rockabilly and punk rock. His songs have been classified as country, cowpunk and psychobilly. They fuse the "tempo and structure of bluegrass" with the "attitude and swagger of heavy metal". Williams' lyrical themes include drug use, hedonism and the outlaw life, as well as criticism of the mainstream country music industry.

Williams' live shows typically follow a Jekyll and Hyde format: a country music set featuring fiddle player David McElfresh and steel guitar player Dan Johnson, followed by a "hellbilly" set of cowpunk and psychobilly songs, and then an Assjack set, which consists of death metal and metalcore songs.

The lineup for Assjack includes the addition of supplemental vocalist Gary Lindsey and the departure of his fiddle and steel guitar players. McElfresh's predecessor was fellow-fiddle-player Michael "Fiddleboy" McCanless, who would play all three sets, adding traditional violin for the country set of the concert before turning on different effect pedals for later sets. Fiddleboy died on February 1, 2003. Another former band member was guitarist Duane Denison, previously with The Jesus Lizard, who left The Damn Band and Assjack in January 2001 and later that year formed Tomahawk.

Discography

Studio albums
 Risin' Outlaw (1999)
 Lovesick, Broke and Driftin' (2002)
 Straight to Hell (2006)
 Damn Right, Rebel Proud (2008)
 Rebel Within (2010)
 Hillbilly Joker (2011)
 Ghost to a Ghost/Gutter Town (Hank3 Records, 2011)
 3 Bar Ranch Cattle Callin' (Hank3 Records, 2011)
 Attention Deficit Domination (Hank3 Records, 2011)
 Brothers of the 4×4 (Hank3 Records, 2013)
 A Fiendish Threat (Hank3 Records, 2013)

 Weekend Star'' (2022)

See also
 Alternative country
 Outlaw country

References

External links
 
 Official Facebook
 

Living people
1972 births
20th-century American drummers
21st-century American singers
21st-century American drummers
21st-century American bass guitarists
American people of English descent
American alternative country singers
American country guitarists
American male guitarists
American country singer-songwriters
American heavy metal bass guitarists
American male bass guitarists
American heavy metal singers
American punk rock bass guitarists
American punk rock drummers
American male drummers
American punk rock guitarists
American punk rock singers
Assjack members
Cowpunk musicians
Curb Records artists
Country musicians from Tennessee
Hank Williams
Guitarists from Tennessee
People from Nashville, Tennessee
Psychobilly musicians
Singer-songwriters from Tennessee
Superjoint members